Roman Prokoph (born 6 August 1985) is a German professional footballer who plays as a forward for Wuppertaler SV.

Career
Born in Berlin, Prokoph began his career with SV Berlin-Chemie Adlershof and joined in 1995 the youth team of 1. FC Union Berlin. After nine years, he was promoted to the first team of Union Berlin and there he played 46 matches and scored eleven goals. On 1 January 2006, he left his team and signed for Ludwigsfelder FC. Here he earned only seven caps and scored three goals in six months.

In summer 2006, he signed for FC St. Pauli. He played ten games in the Regionalliga Nord for St. Pauli and was a key player of the reserve. In July 2008, he signed for the reserve team of VfL Bochum and became the team captain during the 2008–09 season. On 23 November 2009, he earned his first Bundesliga match against Hamburger SV and signed his first professional contract with the Ruhrpott club on 9 February 2010.

On 10 June 2019, it was confirmed, that Prokoph would join SC Fortuna Köln ahead of the 2019–20 season.

Career statistics

References

External links
 

Living people
1985 births
German footballers
Footballers from Berlin
Association football midfielders
Bundesliga players
2. Bundesliga players
3. Liga players
Regionalliga players
Austrian Football Bundesliga players
1. FC Union Berlin players
FC St. Pauli players
VfL Bochum players
VfL Bochum II players
Kapfenberger SV players
SpVgg Unterhaching players
Sportfreunde Lotte players
VfL Osnabrück players
Hannover 96 II players
SC Fortuna Köln players
Wuppertaler SV players
German expatriate footballers
German expatriate sportspeople in Austria
Expatriate footballers in Austria